Šport TV is Slovenia's first sport only public broadcasting channel. Based in the country's capital, Ljubljana. Television was launched on October 14, 2006. Miro Ćorić is editor-in-chief, Marko Bogovac is general manager.

TV channels
 first channel: Šport TV 1 (Š1)
 second channel: Šport TV 2 (Š2)
 third channel: Šport TV 3 (Š3)

Broadcasting competitions

Soccer:

 Copa del Rey 
 A-League  
 Czech First League  
 Copa América 
 AFC Asian Cup
 International Champions Cup 
 Toulon Tournament

Ice hockey:
 Ice Hockey World Championships 
 IIHF World Championship Division I
 Champions Hockey League
 Ice Hockey Federation of Slovenia championship
 Spengler Cup

Handball: 
 EHF Champions League 
 SEHA League 
 Women's EHF Champions League 
 Handball-Bundesliga 
 DHB-Pokal

Basketball:

 Premier A Slovenian Basketball League 
 Liga ACB 
 Basketball Champions League 
 FIBA Basketball World Cup 
 Eurocup Basketball
 NCAA 
 Copa del Rey de Baloncesto

Rugby:

 Six Nations Cup
 Pro14

Automoto:
 
 Motocross World Championship
 Red Bull Air Race World Championship
 Formula E
 Race of Champions

Triathlon:

 ITU World Triathlon Series

Sailing:

 Vendée Globe
 Tahiti Pearl Regatta

Cycling:

 Cape Epic
 Tour of Croatia

External links
sport-tv.si (official)

Television channels in Slovenia
Television channels and stations established in 2006
Sports television in Slovenia
Mass media in Ljubljana